Noah's Arc is an American cable television comedy-drama series that aired for two seasons on the Logo network from October 19, 2005 to October 4, 2006. The show centered on the lives of four Black gay friends who share personal and professional experiences while living in Los Angeles.

After its cancellation, a film was produced entitled Noah's Arc: Jumping the Broom, which was released theatrically in 2008.

Series overview
Originally, the show focused around friends Noah Nicholson, Alex Kirby, Ricky Davis, and Chance Counter. Noah is a financially struggling screenwriter who eventually lands a job as Hollywood film writer, a job that was originally belonged to his boyfriend Wade Robinson. Alex is a HIV counselor and the sassy friend of the group. Ricky is the owner of clothing boutique and the closest friend of Noah. Chance is a college professor. Wade who eventually becomes Noah's boyfriend struggles with his sexual identity as well as the acceptance by Noah's friends. The group endures many social issues throughout the series including same sex dating, same-sex marriage, same-sex parenthood, HIV and AIDS awareness, infidelity, promiscuity, homophobia, and gay bashing.

By season two, Noah and Wade's intimate relationship ends with Noah having a new boyfriend and moving into new home. Alex opens his own HIV clinic with the help of his friends. Ricky enters into a brief relationship with a doctor who is HIV positive but Ricky has his reservations about being intimate. Chance is now a married man who is adapting to married life.

Cast and characters

Darryl Stephens as Noah Nicholson, a screenwriter
Rodney Chester as Alex Kirby, an HIV/AIDS educator
Christian Vincent as Ricky Davis, a promiscuous boutique owner
Doug Spearman as Chance Counter, an economics professor
Jensen Atwood as Wade Robinson, a screenwriter who comes out after falling for Noah

Production

Development

The idea for Noah's Arc originated in 2003 when Patrik-Ian Polk attended a Los Angeles Black gay pride club event. The experience inspired Ian-Polk to write the series that was centered around the lives of Black gay men. The original one-hour pilot was produced independently and released as a web series in 2004, and to assist in funding each episode, the show was originally envisioned as a DVD subscription series. After the web series was well received, the series was picked up by Logo TV as a half-hour series. During production of the pilot episode, Rodney Chester – who portrays Alex in the show – used his own truck as a makeshift hair, make-up and dressing room. After the pilot episode was well received at film festivals and independent screenings, the series was picked up by MTV-affiliated cable network Logo as a half-hour series. The pilot, "My One Temptation", was re-written and re-shot as a two-part premiere episode, and Noah's Arc became LOGO's first scripted series.

Executive producer Dave Mace served as the series' showrunner, with Patrik-Ian Polk and Carol Ann Shine as series' co-executive producers. Pamela Post, Noreen Halpern, Eileen Opatut, and John Morayniss also served as executive producers for the second season.

Casting
Casting for the lead characters of Noah's Arc occurred in early 2003. Pamela Azmi-Andrew was the casting director as Polk sat in on the auditions. For the title lead role, Noah Nicholson, actors Darryl Stephens and Christian Vincent were being considered. Stephens, who originally auditioned for the role of Ricky Davis, was cast as Noah Nicholson. Vincent was later recast as Noah's best friend Ricky Davis.

Rodney Chester was cast as Alex Kirby. Chester maintained a friendship with Polk when he appeared in Polk's independent film Punks, which adapts several elements into the television series. Doug Spearman and Jensen Atwood would later be cast for their respective roles. By mid-2003, a cast was put together for the filming of the pilot episode. Shortly after the release of the pilot episode, Polk wrote and directed another in-depth episode for the characters. Shaun T. Fitness, who was originally cast as Trey Iverson in the pilot episode, was replaced by Gregory Keith in the series. Carlos Tineco, who was originally cast as a random guy whom Ricky has sex with, was cast for the recurring role Junito. The character of Junito was originally a go-go dancer before being rewritten as a doctor and later recast with Wilson Cruz assuming the role in the series. Jurnee Crapps, who played the role of Kenya McEntire, was replaced by Sahara Davis in season two.

Filming
Season one was filmed in Los Angeles, while season two was filmed in Vancouver, British Columbia, Canada.

Reunion
On July 5, 2020, nearly fourteen years after the show ended, the cast reunited for Noah's Arc: The 'Rona Chronicles, an hour-long special aired on YouTube and Facebook. Produced during and based around the COVID-19 pandemic, The 'Rona Chronicles was produced as a virtual reunion, with the actors (and therefore their characters) interacting virtually via Skype. The reunion, which benefited charity, was followed by a live Q&A moderated by Queer Eyes Karamo Brown.

Legacy
Noah's Arc was the first scripted television series to center a group of black gay men.

Episodes

Season one consists of nine episodes, while season two has eight episodes. The unaired pilot is available on the season one DVD box set.

Release

Broadcast
Noah's Arc aired on Logo in the United States. The show became Logo's highest-rated show during its run. Despite the positive feedback from viewership, the show was not renewed for a third season and was later canceled. In the summer of 2008, BET's spin-off cable television channel BET J briefly broadcast the entire series in rotation. In October 2008, the movie Noah's Arc: Jumping the Broom was released which picks up after series' cliffhanger finale.

Streaming
In March 2019, Logo TV began streaming the entire series on their YouTube channel. The episodes were removed from their YouTube channel in September 2019. The series streams on Apple TV (with a subscription). Outside of Logo platform, the series can be found on electronic sell-through platforms such as iTunes and Amazon Prime Video.

Soundtracks
Soundtrack albums for each of the first two seasons were released by Tommy Boy Records. The season one soundtrack was released on March 24, 2006, and features music by such artists as Joshua Radin, Gordon Chambers, Me'shell Ndegéocello, Patrik-Ian Polk, Mary Ann Tatum, and Adriana Evans.

The soundtrack for season two was released on December 15, 2007, featuring the likes of Anthony David, Bedroom Walls, Raz-B, Patrik-Ian Polk, Mike Anthony, and Solange Knowles.

See also
 Noah's Arc: Jumping the Broom

References

External links
 
 
 

2000s American comedy-drama television series
2000s American LGBT-related drama television series
2000s American black sitcoms
2005 American television series debuts
2006 American television series endings
English-language television shows
Gay-related television shows
HIV/AIDS in television
LGBT African-American culture
Logo TV original programming
Same-sex marriage in television
Television shows filmed in Vancouver